The Killer Reserved Nine Seats is a 1974 Italian giallo film directed by Giuseppe Bennati.

Plot 
Patrick Davenant invites a group of friends to visit a theatre inside his villa, a place which later reveals itself as sinister. Within a short time, the guests realise that they are trapped in the villa. A merciless killer then begins to murder them one by one.

Cast 
 Rosanna Schiaffino as Vivian
 Chris Avram as Patrick Davenant
 Eva Czemerys as Rebecca Davenant
 Lucretia Love as Doris
 Paola Senatore as Lynn Davenant
 Gaetano Russo as Duncan Foster
 Andrea Scotti as Albert
 Eduardo Filippone as Mystery Man
 Antonio Guerra as Caretaker
 Howard Ross as Russell
 Janet Agren as Kim

Release
The Killer Reserved Nine Seats was distributed by Overseas Film Company theatrically in Italy on 21 May 1974. The film grossed 427,544,000 Italian lira domestically in Italy.

References

Footnotes

References

External links 

 
 

1974 films
Giallo films
1970s crime thriller films
Films directed by Giuseppe Bennati
Films scored by Carlo Savina
1970s Italian films